Benjamín Akoto Asamoah (born 4 January 1994) is a Ghanaian footballer who plays for Cypriot club Doxa as a midfielder.

Club career 
Born in Accra, Benjamín arrived at the youth academy of Atlético Madrid from the Rayo Majadahonda counterpart in 2012. After a stint with Atlético Madrid C, he was promoted to the B-team in 2012. On 29 May 2015, his contract was extended by the club till June 2017. On 3 August 2016, he moved to fellow Spanish club Hospitalet.

On 6 August 2017, Benjamín joined Cypriot First Division club Doxa where he was assigned the 17 number jersey.

Club statistics

References

External links 

La Preferente profile

1994 births
Living people
Association football midfielders
Ghanaian footballers
Atlético Madrid C players
Atlético Madrid B players
CE L'Hospitalet players
Doxa Katokopias FC players
Segunda División B players
Cypriot First Division players
Ghanaian expatriate footballers